Rita Fleming is an American politician. She serves as a Democratic member for the 71st district of the Indiana House of Representatives.

Fleming studied at Murray State University as an undergraduate, and as a postgraduate at Vanderbilt University and the University of Louisville. Fleming has worked as a registered nurse, nurse practitioner, and obstretician and gynecologist.

In 2018, she was elected for the 71st district of the Indiana House of Representatives, succeeding Steven R. Stemler, and assumed office on November 7, 2018.
She was re-elected in 2020 and 2022.

References 

Living people
Place of birth missing (living people)
Year of birth missing (living people)
Democratic Party members of the Indiana House of Representatives
21st-century American politicians
21st-century American women politicians
20th-century American women